Mont Vully (653 m; in German also known as Wistenlacherberg) is a hill of the Swiss Plateau, located between Lake Morat and Lake Neuchâtel in the canton of Fribourg, east of the border with the canton of Vaud.

The south side, overlooking Murten and its lake, is covered by vineyards. The north side, overlooking Lake Neuchâtel, is mostly wooded.

See also
 List of most isolated mountains of Switzerland

References

External links

 Mont Vully on Wanderland.ch

Mountains of the canton of Fribourg
Mountains of Switzerland
Mountains of Switzerland under 1000 metres